is a former Japanese football player.

Playing career
Asakura was born in Shizuoka Prefecture on May 11, 1973. After graduating from high school, he joined the new club Shimizu S-Pulse, based in his area, in 1992. He got an opportunity to play little by little in the first season and the club won the 2nd place 1992 and 1993 J.League Cup. However he could not play many matches and he moved to the Japan Football League club Consadole Sapporo in 1996. Although the club won the championship in 1997 and was promoted to J1 League, he did not play in many matches and retired at the end of the 1997 season.

Club statistics

References

External links

geocities.co.jp

1973 births
Living people
Association football people from Shizuoka Prefecture
Japanese footballers
J1 League players
Japan Football League (1992–1998) players
Shimizu S-Pulse players
Hokkaido Consadole Sapporo players
Association football midfielders